Mary Doreen Archer, Baroness Archer of Weston-super-Mare  ( Weeden; born 22 December 1944) is a British scientist specialising in solar power conversion. She is married to Jeffrey Archer, a former deputy chairman of the Conservative Party.

Early life and education
Mary Weeden was born in Epsom, Surrey, in December 1944. She was the younger daughter of Harold N. Weeden, a chartered accountant, and Doreen Cox. She attended Cheltenham Ladies' College, before reading chemistry at St Anne's College, Oxford. She went on to study for a PhD in physical chemistry at Imperial College London. Her thesis was titled "Heterogeneous catalysis of inorganic substitution reactions" and was submitted in 1968.

Career
Archer was a junior research fellow at St Hilda's College, Oxford, from 1968 to 1971. She was then a temporary lecturer in chemistry at Somerville College, Oxford for the 1971/72 academic year. After Oxford, she worked as a scientific researcher under George Porter at the Royal Institution in London. It was during this period that she became interested in photoelectrochemistry, and has since written and lectured extensively on the subject.

In the mid-1970s, she was appointed to the board of directors of the International Solar Energy Society. Between 1976 and 1986, she was a fellow of Newnham College and a lecturer in chemistry at Trinity College of the University of Cambridge. From 1984 to 1991, she was a director of the Fitzwilliam Museum Trust in Cambridge. She was a non-executive director of Mid Anglia Radio plc between 1988 and 1995. She sings first alto and in 1988 released a CD of Christmas carols, titled A Christmas Carol. In 1988, Archer joined the Council of Lloyds Insurance Company, becoming chair of the Lloyds Hardship Committee the following year. She had been a Lloyds 'Name' since 1977.

From 1988 to 2000, she was chair of the National Energy Foundation, which promotes improving the use of energy in buildings. She later became its president and is currently its patron. She is also president of the UK Solar Energy Society (UK-ISES). Weeden is also a Companion of the Energy Institute and was awarded the institute's Melchett Medal in 2002.

She has written and contributed to various volumes of work concerning solar energy, including Photochemical & Photoelectrochemical Approaches to Solar Energy Conversion, which took 15 years to write. She co-edited Clean Electricity from Photovoltaics (2001); Molecular to Global Photosynthesis (2004); The 1702 Chair of Chemistry at Cambridge: Transformation and Change (2005) and Nanostructured and Photoelectrochemical Systems for Solar Photon Conversion (2008).

In 1994 Lady Archer was a non-executive director of Anglia Television at a time when it was the target of a takeover bid. Following reports from the London Stock Exchange, the Department of Trade and Industry appointed inspectors on 8 February 1994 to investigate possible insider trading contraventions by certain individuals, including her husband. No charges were brought.

She was chair of Cambridge University Hospitals NHS Foundation Trust (incorporating Addenbrooke's and the Rosie Hospitals) for 10 years until 2012, having previously been a non-executive director (1993–99), and vice-chair (1999–2002) of Addenbrooke's Hospital NHS Trust. Between 2005 and 2008, she led a pioneer NHS-funded initiative to create patient decision aids for patients with localised prostate cancer (or BPH). In 2007 she was awarded the Eva Philbin Award of the Institute of Chemistry of Ireland. She was founder director of Cambridge University Health Partners, 2009–2012, and was deputy chair of ACT (Addenbrooke's Charitable Trust) from 1997 to 2015. She is currently leading a group to create an online PDA and information/advice for bladder cancer patients in Addenbrooke's Hospital, and across the Anglia Cancer Network.

On 24 February 2020, Archer was installed as chancellor of the University of Buckingham.

Archer served as a trustee of the Science Museum Group from 1990 to 2000, and was appointed its chair in 2015.

Honours
Archer was appointed Dame Commander of the Order of the British Empire (DBE) in the 2012 Birthday Honours for services to the National Health Service.

In December 2013, a new link road was opened in Cambridge connecting the Addenbrooke's Road to the southern side of the hospital opposite the Rosie extension.  This road was named Dame Mary Archer Way in recognition of the achievements of the former chairman.

Personal life
She married Jeffrey Archer in July 1966, having met him at Oxford University, where he had been studying for a diploma in education. They have two children: William Archer (born 1972), a theatre producer, and James Archer (born 1974), a financial advisor and businessman.

The Archers live in the Old Vicarage, Grantchester, near Cambridge.

In the summer of 1974, the Archers were struck by a financial crisis when Jeffrey lost over £400,000 in a bad investment. Faced with the threat of bankruptcy, the Archers were forced to move out of their large house in The Boltons. Mary took up a teaching post at Cambridge University which, together with her husband's eventual success as a novelist, saved them from financial ruin.

In 1987 she gave evidence at the High Court in a libel case brought by her husband against the Daily Star newspaper, which had correctly reported that Jeffrey had hired a sex worker, with whom he had sexual intercourse. In 2001, when Jeffrey Archer was prosecuted for having committed perjury and for perverting the course of justice in the 1987 trial, she appeared at the Old Bailey as a defence witness.  Jeffrey Archer was subsequently convicted and imprisoned for perjury and perverting the course of justice. The trial judge, Mr Justice Potts, questioned the veracity of Lady Archer's evidence, suggesting that she too had perjured herself. However, no further action was taken.

In 2003, she sued her former personal assistant, Jane Williams over her breach of confidentiality. Archer was granted a permanent injunction against Williams plus £2,500 damages, for her claim she misappropriated confidential documents about the Archer family, and had contracted the sale of the personal information to the media which was then published by the Sunday Mirror newspaper. Williams had taken Lady Archer to an industrial tribunal on a complaint of unfair dismissal. The complaint was dismissed by the panel in 2002.

Between 1991 and 1999 she sat on the council of The Cheltenham Ladies' College.

In 2011 she said she had recently undergone major surgery for bladder cancer.

References

Further reading

1944 births
20th-century chemists
21st-century chemists
20th-century British women scientists
21st-century British women scientists
Archer of Weston-super-Mare
British physical chemists
British women chemists
British women academics
Living people
People from Epsom
People from Grantchester
People educated at Cheltenham Ladies' College
Alumni of St Anne's College, Oxford
Alumni of Imperial College London
Fellows of Newnham College, Cambridge
Members of the University of Cambridge Department of Chemistry
Women academic administrators
English science writers
Directors of museums in the United Kingdom
Women museum directors
People associated with the Science Museum, London
British women in business
British women business executives
20th-century British businesspeople
21st-century British businesspeople
Dames Commander of the Order of the British Empire
Spouses of life peers
British academic administrators
British women educators
20th-century English educators
21st-century English educators
20th-century English businesswomen
20th-century English businesspeople
21st-century English businesswomen
21st-century English businesspeople
People associated with the University of Buckingham
20th-century women educators
21st-century women educators